Karlskoga Motorstadion, also known as Gelleråsen Arena, is the oldest permanent motorsport race track in Sweden.
The layout is such that the whole track can be seen from all spectator areas.

It is currently authorised for European Championship rounds of road racing and Swedish Touring Car Championship events.

History
Built in 1949 as a  dirt track, the inaugural race was the first Kanonloppet on 4 June 1950.

In 1961, 1962 and 1963 non-championship Formula One events were hosted here, which saw the likes of Stirling Moss, Jim Clark and Jack Brabham battle it out on-track. 1967 a race called Swedish Grand Prix was held there, won by Jackie Stewart. In 1979, the circuit hosted the Swedish motorcycle Grand Prix won by Barry Sheene.

The circuit was forced to close for two years after a crash on 8 August 1970 during a touring car event.
Two cars, a Ford Escort and a BMW 2002, locked together at the flat out right hander before the straight leading up to the Velodromkurvan, and went off the track at high speed, bounced over the banking and into the crowd, killing five spectators.

After a period of decay, the track went through major renovation work during the 1990s and 2000s.

The pit area was moved and the facilities were improved. There was also several safety improvements, including a redesign of the Tröskurvan and the complete removal of the velodrome section.

Lap records 

The official race lap records at the Karlskoga Motorstadion are listed as:

Notes

References

External links

Motorsport venues in Sweden
Grand Prix motorcycle circuits
Buildings and structures in Karlskoga Municipality